The Roman Catholic Diocese of Chiayi (Lat: Dioecesis Kiayiensis) is a diocese of the Latin Church of the  Roman Catholic Church in Taiwan.

Originally erected as an Apostolic Prefecture of Chiayi in 1952, the Prefecture was elevated to a full diocese in 1962. The diocese is a suffragan of the Archdiocese of Taipei.

Ordinaries
Matthew Kia Yen-wen (21 May 1970 Appointed – 14 Dec 1974 Appointed, Bishop of Hwalien)
Joseph Ti-kang (21 Jun 1975 Appointed – 3 May 1985 Appointed, Coadjutor Archbishop of Taipei)
Joseph Lin Thien-chu † (25 Nov 1985 Appointed – 4 Mar 1994 Died)
Peter Liu Cheng-chung (1 Jul 1994 Appointed – 5 Jul 2004 Appointed, Coadjutor Bishop of Kaohsiung)
John Hung Shan-chuan, S.V.D. (16 Jan 2006 Appointed – 9 Nov 2007 Appointed, Archbishop of Taipei)
Thomas Chung An-zu (24 Jan 2008 Appointed – 23 May 2020 Appointed, Archbishop of Taipei)
Norbert Pu Ying-hsiung (15 Feb 2022 Appointed – present)

See also

Catholic Church in Taiwan

Chiayi
Roman Catholic dioceses and prelatures established in the 20th century
Christian organizations established in 1952
1952 establishments in Taiwan
Chiayi